Keneiloe Molopyane (born in 1987 in Benoni) is a South African biological archaeologist and paleoanthropologist. She began studying archeology at the University of Pretoria, and later completed a master 's degree in archeobiology at the University of York. In 2021 she completed a doctoral thesis in biological anthropology at Wits University. In 2021, she was named an "emerging explorer" by the National Geographic Society.

See also
List of archaeologists

References

1987 births
South African women archaeologists
Living people
University of Pretoria alumni
Alumni of the University of York